Wierzchno may refer to the following places:
Wierzchno, Lubusz Voivodeship (west Poland)
Wierzchno, Choszczno County in West Pomeranian Voivodeship (north-west Poland)
Wierzchno, Myślibórz County in West Pomeranian Voivodeship (north-west Poland)